Vyacheslav Lychkin (born 30 September 1973) is a retired Azerbaijani professional footballer. He made his professional debut in the Soviet Second League in 1989 for FC Termist Baku.

International career
For Azerbaijan, Lychkin is capped 45 times, scoring 4 goal. He made his national team debut on 26 April 1995 against Romania in Euro 1996 qualifying. He scored his first goal on 27 February 1996 against Faroe Islands in a friendly match.

International goals

Honours
 Azerbaijan Premier League champion: 1997–98.
 Azerbaijan Premier League runner-up: 2004–05.

References

1973 births
Living people
Footballers from Baku
Soviet footballers
Azerbaijani footballers
Azerbaijan international footballers
Azerbaijani expatriate footballers
FC Baku players
FC Dynamo Stavropol players
FC Anzhi Makhachkala players
Trabzonspor footballers
Turun Palloseura footballers
FC Tyumen players
FC Moscow players
Khazar Lankaran FK players
Shamakhi FK players
Simurq PIK players
FC Dynamo Saint Petersburg players
Azerbaijan Premier League players
Russian Premier League players
Süper Lig players
Azerbaijani people of Russian descent
Azerbaijani expatriate sportspeople in Finland
Azerbaijani expatriate sportspeople in Turkey
FC Kristall Smolensk players
Association football midfielders
Neftçi PFK players
FC Lukhovitsy players
FC Lokomotiv Saint Petersburg players
Veikkausliiga players
Expatriate footballers in Finland
Expatriate footballers in Turkey